Chiprovtsi Point (‘Nos Chiprovtsi’ \'nos 'chi-prov-tsi\) is a point projecting  northwestwards from the north coast of Rugged Island off the west coast of Byers Peninsula of Livingston Island in the South Shetland Islands, Antarctica, and forming the east side of the entrance to Nishava Cove.

The point is named after the town of Chiprovtsi in northwestern Bulgaria.

Location
British mapping in 1968, Spanish in 1992 and Bulgarian in 2009.

See also 
 Composite Antarctic Gazetteer
 List of Antarctic islands south of 60° S
 SCAR
 Territorial claims in Antarctica

Maps
 Península Byers, Isla Livingston. Mapa topográfico a escala 1:25000. Madrid: Servicio Geográfico del Ejército, 1992.
 L.L. Ivanov. Antarctica: Livingston Island and Greenwich, Robert, Snow and Smith Islands. Scale 1:120000 topographic map.  Troyan: Manfred Wörner Foundation, 2009.

Notes

References
 Chiprovtsi Point. SCAR Composite Antarctic Gazetteer
 Bulgarian Antarctic Gazetteer. Antarctic Place-names Commission. (details in Bulgarian, basic data in English)

External links
 Chiprovtsi Point. Copernix satellite image

Headlands of the South Shetland Islands
Bulgaria and the Antarctic